"Lifted Up (1985)" is a song by American indietronica band Passion Pit from their third studio album, Kindred (2015). The song was written and produced by the band's frontman Michael Angelakos as well as Benjamin Levin (known as Benny Blanco) with Chris Zane and Alex Aldi providing co-production. It was released as the lead single from the album in February 2015. The song was later included in Konami's Pro Evolution Soccer 2016 as part of the game's soundtrack.

Background
Michael Angelakos wrote the song in gratitude for his wife for coming to him "at a point in my life where I really was pretty lost." She was born in 1985.

Music video
The song's music video features Angelakos alongside a crowd of partiers. For each verse, the crowd gets less and less chaotic; starting with white strobing lights as the partiers toss Angelakos around and make him feel claustrophobic. During the second verse, calmer, fazing blue lights fill the party with Angelakos looking more comfortable, but still slightly awkward around the partiers. During the final verse, the lights are orange and everyone is standing still with only Angelakos dancing happily in an almost euphoric trance. As the final chorus plays, everyone begins dancing as Angelakos is literally "lifted off the ground" and above the partiers. The video, and song, end with everything cutting to black.

Formats and track listings
Digital download
 "Lifted Up (1985)" – 4:23

Charts

References

2015 singles
Passion Pit songs
2015 songs
Songs written by Michael Angelakos
Songs written by Benny Blanco
Columbia Records singles
Song recordings produced by Benny Blanco
Music videos directed by Philip Andelman